Ukraine competed at the 2003 Winter Universiade in Tarvisio, Italy (ice hockey and ski jumping events were held in neighbouring regions of Austria). Ukraine won 14 medals, seven of which were gold, ranked 2nd by both number of gold medals and shared 2nd place with Japan and hosts Italy by the overall number of medals.

Medallists

Figure skating

See also
 Ukraine at the 2003 Summer Universiade

References

Sources
 Results in cross-country skiing
 Results in figure skating

Ukraine at the Winter Universiade
Winter Universiade
2003 Winter Universiade